The 1964 Manyas earthquake happened on October 6 on the southern coast of Marmara Sea near the city of Karacabey in Bursa Province, Turkey. The shock had a moment magnitude of 6.8 and a maximum Mercalli intensity of IX (Violent). Around $5 million in damage was caused, with 19–73 killed and 100–239 injured.

See also
 List of earthquakes in 1964
 List of earthquakes in Turkey

References

Further reading

External links

Earthquakes in Turkey
1964 earthquakes
History of Bursa Province
Manyas
Manyas earthquake
October 1964 events in Europe
1964 disasters in Turkey